Seay Peak is a pointed ice-free peak, 1,805 m, the northeasternmost summit in the Finger Ridges, Cook Mountains. Mapped by the United States Geological Survey (USGS) from tellurometer surveys and Navy air photos, 1959–63. Named by Advisory Committee on Antarctic Names (US-ACAN) for Benny F. Seay, a member of the U.S. Army aviation support unit for Topo North and Topo South (1961–62) which conducted the tellurometer surveys.

Mountains of Oates Land